The Deshwali, or sometimes pronounced Deswali, are a Muslim & Jat community found in the state of Rajasthan in India. A small number of Deshwali are found in the city of Hyderabad, Jharkhand .

History and origin
The community gets its name from the word desh, which in the local Marwari language means land and wali, which in Persian (originally from Arabic) means lord, literally the word Deshwali means a feudal lord. They were employed as soldiers in the army of Prithvi Raj Chauhan. They are the early adopters of the Islam in India, which they accepted via the preaching of the Sufi saint Moinuddin Chishti. In Madhya Pradesh, the community lives in Indore, Barnagar and Ratlam. In Rajasthan, they live in Nagour, Ajmer, Tonk, Bhilwara, Kota, Baran, Jhalawar, Bundi, Udaipur and Jaipur districts. They speak the Marwari dialect, with many having knowledge of Urdu.

Present circumstances
The Deshwali are generally an endogamous community. They have no system of gotras, and practice both parallel and cross-cousin marriages.  The community consists of large to medium-sized farmers, and like other Rajput groups in Rajasthan, have been affected by the abolishment of the Jagirdari system. A small number of Deshwali are sharecroppers and landless agricultural labourers. A few are also engaged in petty business, and the community has seen a growth in education and the start of urbanization.  The Deshwali are Sunni and continue to pay special reverence to Moinuddin Chishti, the Sufi saint of Ajmer.  They are relatively more orthodox than the Merat and Cheetah, neighbouring Muslim Rajput communities.

In addition to the Deswalis in India, there is also community of Deshwali found in the city of Hyderabad and adjoining rural areas. They maintain close relations with the Qaimkhani and Khanzada, two neighbouring Rajasthani communities found in Sindh.

References

Social groups of Rajasthan
Jat clans
Muslim communities of India
Muslim communities of Rajasthan
Sindhi tribes